Boh Runga (born 1969/1970) is a New Zealand recording artist and was the lead singer and guitarist in New Zealand rock band Stellar. Boh is the older sister of Bic Runga and Pearl Runga who are also musicians.

Early life
Boh grew up in Christchurch, New Zealand. She is the daughter of Joseph Runga, a Maori ex-serviceman and Sophia Tang, a Chinese singer who abandoned her own music career in Malaysia to join Joseph in his home country. Joseph was a self-taught pianist and died in 2005 from a heart attack. Runga is of Ngāti Kahungunu descent.

Boh left Christchurch for Auckland to form Stellar in the late 1990s. After signing with Sony Music, Stellar released their 1999 debut album Mix and quickly became Sony's biggest selling New Zealand band as the album went multi-platinum. Stellar also secured eight Tui Awards for Mix and its 2001 follow up Magic Line.

Early career

After the release of 'Magic Line' and the subsequent touring of New Zealand, Australia and Europe, Boh went to Los Angeles in 2003 to hone her skills as a songwriter at the invitation of her LA-based music publishers, Chrysalis. She now lives in Los Angeles. Since 2003, she has been married to Campbell Smith, who is the manager for her sister Bic and chief executive of the Recording Industry Association of New Zealand.

In 2007, a fortuitous introduction to the gold bullion company NZ Mint led Boh into designing and launching her first jewellery range called 'Birdland', based on her love of New Zealand's native birds. Due to the success of both 'Birdland' and her second collection, 'The Messenger Stories', Runga now plans to release the jewellery in Australia and North America.

Solo career 

Runga's first solo album, Right Here was released on 14 July 2009. Strongly reflective of her time spent in Silver Lake, LA, the album tells tales of love, loss and life. Recorded over six months in the Hollywood studio of producer Marshall Altman, Right Here was warmly received on its recent New Zealand release. The New Zealand Herald gave the album 4 out of 5 stars, noting "its unashamed blockbuster urges and tunepower make it all the more irresistible" and Real Groove called it "an assured collection of streamlined tunes that's guaranteed to surf the airwaves. Collaborators on the album include Serj Tankian (System of a Down), Greg Laswell and writing collaborations with Wendy Melvoin (Prince and the Revolution), Shelly Peiken and Rod Stewart's songwriter Kevin Savigar.

In December 2012, Runga starred in an online video campaign supporting gay marriage, alongside other New Zealand singers Anika Moa and Hollie Smith, as well as Olympian Danyon Loader and former Governor-General Dame Catherine Tizard.

In August 2014, Runga featured with other New Zealand artists on the charity single "Song for Everyone".

Discography

Albums
 Right Here (2009)

Singles

References

External links 
 Stellar official website

 Evelyn music video released 2 June 2008 on NZ On Screen
 Boh Runga official website

1969 births
APRA Award winners
Ngāti Kahungunu people
New Zealand people of Chinese descent
New Zealand people of Malaysian descent
Women guitarists
New Zealand women singer-songwriters
20th-century New Zealand women singers
New Zealand rock singers
New Zealand Māori women singers
People from Christchurch
Living people
New Zealand LGBT rights activists
21st-century New Zealand women singers